Dave Green (born September 21, 1949) is a former punter and placekicker in the National Football League. He played for the Houston Oilers, the Cincinnati Bengals, and the Tampa Bay Buccaneers. He played college football for the Ohio Bobcats.

Green was the last NFL player, along with the Cleveland Browns' Don Cockroft, to serve as his team's primary kicker and punter over the course of a season, when he led the Buccaneers in both categories in 1976.  He was the first player to score for the Tampa Bay Buccaneers in their franchise history.

References

1949 births
Living people
People from Mason City, Iowa
American football punters
American football placekickers
Ohio Bobcats football players
Houston Oilers players
Cincinnati Bengals players
Tampa Bay Buccaneers players